Ketotic hypoglycemia is a medical term used in two ways: (1) broadly, to refer to any circumstance in which low blood glucose is accompanied by ketosis, and (2) also nutritional ketosis. It remains one of the more common causes of hypoglycemia in the age range.

Signs and symptoms
The typical patient with ketotic hypoglycemia is a young child between the ages of 10 months and 6 years. Episodes nearly always occur in the morning after an overnight fast, often one that is longer than usual. Symptoms include those of neuroglycopenia, ketosis, or both. The neuroglycopenic symptoms usually include lethargy and malaise, but may include unresponsiveness or seizures. The principal symptoms of ketosis are anorexia, abdominal discomfort, and nausea, sometimes progressing to vomiting.

If severe, parents usually take the child to a local emergency department, where blood is drawn. The glucose is usually found to be between 35 and 60 mg/dl (1.8-3.1 mmol/L). The total CO2 is usually somewhat low as well, (14-19 mmol/L is typical), and if urine is obtained, high levels of ketones are discovered. Ketones can also be measured in the blood at the bedside (Medisense glucometer). Other routine tests are normal. If given intravenous fluids with saline and dextrose, the child improves dramatically and is usually restored to normal health within a few hours. These symptoms are normally seen because of the child being unadapted to using fat as energy, typically when the child's daily glucose intake might be too high (more than 50g/day for a child). This is also  associated with fluctuant glycemia throughout the day.

A first episode is usually attributed to a viral infection or acute gastroenteritis. However, in most of these children one or more additional episodes recur over next few years and become immediately recognizable to the parents. In mild cases, carbohydrates and a few hours of sleep will be enough to end the symptoms.

Precipitating factors, conditions that trigger an episode, may include extended fasting (e.g., missing supper the night before), a low carbohydrate intake the previous day (e.g., a hot dog without a bun), or stress such as a viral infection. Most children affected by ketotic hypoglycemia have a slender build, many with a weight percentile below height percentile, though without other evidence of malnutrition. Overweight children are rarely affected.

Ketotic hypoglycemia in glycogen storage disease
Some of the subtypes of glycogen storage disease show ketotic hypoglycemia after fasting periods. Especially glycogen storage disease type IX can be a common cause for ketotic hypoglycemia, with the most common sub-type IXa mainly affecting boys.  With glycogen storage disease type XIa, children can usually appear overweight for height, but this is attributed to an enlarged liver (hepatomegaly).

Cause
There are hundreds of causes of hypoglycemia. Normally, the defensive, physiological response to a falling blood glucose is reduction of insulin secretion to undetectable levels, and release of glucagon, adrenaline, and other counterregulatory hormones. This shift of hormones initiates glycogenolysis and gluconeogenesis in the liver, and lipolysis in adipose tissue. Lipids are metabolized to triglycerides, in turn to fatty acids, which are transformed in the mitochondria of liver and kidney cells to the ketone bodies— acetoacetate, beta-hydroxybutyrate, and acetone. Ketones can be used by the brain as an alternate fuel when glucose is scarce. A high level of ketones in the blood, ketosis, is thus a normal response to hypoglycemia in healthy people of all ages.

The presence or absence of ketosis is therefore an important clue to the cause of hypoglycemia in an individual patient. Absence of ketosis ("nonketotic hypoglycemia") most often indicates excessive insulin as the cause of the hypoglycemia. Less commonly, it may indicate a fatty acid oxidation disorder.

Natural history
Children "outgrow" ketotic hypoglycemia, presumably because fasting tolerance improves as body mass increases. In most the episodes become milder and more infrequent by 4 to 5 years of age and rarely occur after age 9. Onset of hypoglycemia with ketosis after age 5 or persistence after age 7 should elicit referral and an intensive search for a more specific disease.

Diagnosis
The diagnosis is based on a combination of typical clinical features and exclusion by a pediatric endocrinologist of other causes of "hypoglycemia with ketosis," especially growth hormone deficiency, hypopituitarism, adrenal insufficiency, and identifiable inborn errors of metabolism such as organic acidoses.

The most useful diagnostic tests include measurement of insulin, growth hormone, cortisol, and lactic acid at the time of the hypoglycemia. Plasma acylcarnitine levels and urine organic acids exclude some of the important metabolic diseases. When the episodes are recurrent or severe, the definitive test is a hospitalization for a supervised diagnostic fast. This usually demonstrates "accelerated fasting"—a shorter time until the glucose begins to fall, but normal metabolic and counterregulatory responses as the glucose falls. As the glucose reaches hypoglycemic levels, the insulin is undetectable, counterregulatory hormones, fatty acids, and ketones are high, and glucagon injection elicits no rise of glucose.

Treatment
Once ketotic hypoglycemia is suspected and other conditions excluded, appropriate treatment reduces the frequency and duration of episodes. Extended fasts should be avoided. The child should be given a bedtime snack of carbohydrates (e.g. spaghetti or pasta or milk) and should be awakened and fed after the usual duration of sleep. If the child is underweight, a daily nutritional supplement may be recommended.  Raw cornstarch dissolved in a beverage helps individuals with hypoglycemia, especially that caused by Glycogen Storage Disease, sustain their blood sugars for longer periods of time and may be given at bedtime.

If a spell begins, carbohydrates and fluids should be given promptly. If vomiting prevents this, the child should be taken to the local emergency department for a few hours of intravenous saline and dextrose. This treatment is often expedited by supplying the parents with a letter describing the condition and recommended treatment.

References

External links

Disorders of endocrine pancreas